40 (Ulster) Signal Regiment (Volunteers) was a Territorial Army regiment in the Royal Corps of Signals in the British Army. The regiment formed part of 2 (National Communications) Signal Brigade, providing military communications for national operations. The regiment did not have an internal security role in Northern Ireland.

History
The Regiment was formed 1 April 1967 in Belfast by the amalgamation of 66 Signal Regiment (TA), 81 Signal Regiment (AER) and 302 Signal Squadron. Due to the reduction in Territorial Army Royal Signals units, as a result of the Strategic Review of Reserves, the regiment was disbanded on 31 March 2010. 66 Squadron and 69 Squadron were transferred to the command of 32 Signal Regiment.

Structure
The structure in 2010 was as follows:
66 (City of Belfast) Support Squadron at Clonaver Park, Belfast. 
69  Signal Squadron at Belfast and Limavady. 
85 (Ulster and Antrim Artillery) Signal Squadron at Lisburn.

References

External links 
 Official Website

Regiments of the Royal Corps of Signals
Military units and formations established in 1967
Army Reserve (United Kingdom)
Military of Northern Ireland